Pine Mountain Ridge (or simply Pine Mountain) is a massif of the Transverse Ranges located in northern Ventura County, and entirely within the Los Padres National Forest. The ridge is a large block of Matilija Sandstone, and reaches some of the highest elevations in the southern Transverse Ranges. The north slope of the ridge is part of the Sespe Wilderness.

Major peaks on the ridge include, from west to east, Reyes Peak, Haddock Peak, and Thorn Point.

Ecology
The ridge is located in the California montane chaparral and woodlands ecoregion. Lower slopes are dominated by chaparral, while the upper reaches of the mountain support a thick pine forest of Coulter pines and California incense cedars.

See also
 Santa Ynez Mountains - to the west
 Topatopa Mountains - to the south
 Sierra Pelona Mountains - to the east
 San Emigdio Mountains - to the north

References

External links
 Los Padres National Forest: "Pine Mountain and Reyes Peak Campgrounds"

Transverse Ranges
Mountain ranges of Ventura County, California
Los Padres National Forest
Mountain ranges of Southern California